This is a list of the players who were on the rosters of the given teams that participated in the 2008 Beijing Paralympics for wheelchair basketball.

Men

Group A













Group B













Women

Group A











Group B











See also
Basketball at the 2008 Summer Olympics – Men's team rosters
Basketball at the 2008 Summer Olympics – Women's team rosters

References

Results - Beijing 2008 Paralympic Games - Wheelchair Basketball - Men, International Paralympic Committee (IPC)
Results - Beijing 2008 Paralympic Games - Wheelchair Basketball - Women, International Paralympic Committee (IPC)

2008